Oriyon (Russian and Tajik: Ориён, formerly Jarbulak) is a village and jamoat in north-west Tajikistan. It is located in Asht District in Sughd Region. The jamoat has a total population of 17,487 (2015).

Notes

References

Populated places in Sughd Region
Jamoats of Tajikistan